Eamon Kissane (13 January 1899 – 20 May 1979) was an Irish Fianna Fáil politician who served as Parliamentary Secretary to the Taoiseach and Parliamentary Secretary to the Minister for Defence from 1943 to 1948, and Parliamentary Secretary to the Minister for Lands from February 1943 to July 1943. He served as a Senator from 1951 to 1965 and a Teachta Dála (TD) from 1932 to 1951.

Political career
Kissane was first elected to Dáil Éireann as a Fianna Fáil TD for the Kerry constituency at the 1932 general election which began sixteen years of unbroken rule for Éamon de Valera's Fianna Fáil. In the last months of the 10th Dáil, Kissane got his first promotion, as Parliamentary Secretary to the Minister for Lands, from February to June 1943. After Fianna Fáil's victory at the 1944 general election, Kissane was appointed as Parliamentary Secretary to the Taoiseach (Government Chief Whip) and as Parliamentary Secretary to the Minister for Defence. He served in that position until when Fianna Fáil was defeated at the 1948 general election, when the First Inter-Party Government took office.

Fianna Fáil won the 1951 general election, but Kissane lost his own Dáil seat in Kerry North. He stood again in Kerry North at the 1954 general election, but was not successful.

After his defeat in 1951, Kissane was nominated by the Taoiseach to the 7th Seanad, and in 1954, he was elected by the Cultural and Educational Panel to the 8th Seanad. The panel returned him to the next two Seanads, but he did not contest the 1965 election to the 11th Seanad, and retired from politics.

References

 

1899 births
1979 deaths
Fianna Fáil TDs
Members of the 7th Dáil
Members of the 8th Dáil
Members of the 9th Dáil
Members of the 10th Dáil
Members of the 11th Dáil
Members of the 12th Dáil
Members of the 13th Dáil
Members of the 7th Seanad
Members of the 8th Seanad
Members of the 9th Seanad
Members of the 10th Seanad
Parliamentary Secretaries of the 12th Dáil
Parliamentary Secretaries of the 11th Dáil
Parliamentary Secretaries of the 10th Dáil
Nominated members of Seanad Éireann
Fianna Fáil senators
Government Chief Whip (Ireland)